The Academy of Dramatic Art ( or ADU) is a Croatian drama school. Since its inception in 1896, the institution grew in prominence resulting in its successful affiliation with the University of Zagreb in 1979, along with the Academy of Music and the Academy of Fine Arts. The Academy serves as the country's premier drama school, providing education for all types of professions related to theatre, television and film production, including actors, directors, cinematographers, playwrights, screenwriters, dramaturgs and editors.

History 

The need for an academy of drama in Zagreb was first mentioned in the Croatian parliament's 1861 piece of theatre legislation which stipulated that a "school for theatre personnel should be formed in Zagreb". However, the modern-day academy traces its roots to the Croatian Drama School which was established by Stjepan Miletić in 1896, more than 30 years after the 1861 law. The school was housed in a building at Republic of Croatia Square, which it occupies today.

During its history the school was renamed and reformed several times. Up until mid-20th century, its primary role was vocational training of theatre actors. Later, departments for film and television were added. In November 1950, the school was legally recognized as a higher education institution, mainly through the efforts of Branko Gavella, Drago Ivanišević and Ranko Marinković, prompting a rename to "academy". In 1979, it officially became part of the University of Zagreb.

During the Croatian War of Independence, in the Zagreb rocket attacks on 3 May 1995, the Academy's building was hit by cluster bombs fired on Zagreb's city centre (Donji grad). The dean's office and the dramaturgy department offices were badly damaged in the attack and two employees and four students were wounded, including Luka Skračić, a first-year student of film directing, who later died. In memory of this event, the Academy officially proclaimed 3 May as Academy Day and a plaque commemorating the attack was unveiled on its 10th anniversary in 2005.

In the period between 1950 and 1994 a total of 574 students have graduated from the Academy's departments. The Academy is also member of various international associations such as CILECT (Centre International de Liaison des Ecoles de Cinéma et de Télévision), IIRT (Instituto Internationale per la Ricerca Teatrale), IFIRT (International Federation for Theatre Research) and ELIA (European League of Institutes of the Arts).

Organisation 
As of 2010 the academy has eight departments:
Acting department
Theatre and radio directing department
Film and television directing department
Cinematography department
Dramaturgy department
Production department
Film editing department
Dance department

Rectors and Deans 
Between 1950 and 1979 the head of the Academy was titled "Rector" (Rektor) as it had been an independent learning institution. In 1979 it became part of the University of Zagreb and since then its head holds the title of "Dean" (Dekan).

 1950–1954 - Josip Škavić
 1954–1962 - Branko Gavella
 1962–1970 - Kosta Spaić
 1970–1972 - Bratoljub Klaić
 1972–1976 - Izet Hajdarhodžić
 1976–1980 - Vladan Švacov
 1980–1982 - Nikola Batušić
 1982–1984 - Tomislav Radić
 1984–1986 - Joško Juvančić
 1986–1988 - Nikola Batušić
 1988–1992 - Enes Midžić
 1992 - Vlatko Pavletić
 1992–1996 - Enes Midžić
 1996–2000 - Maja Rodica-Virag
 2000–2004 - Vjeran Zuppa
 2004–2008 - Branko Ivanda
 2008–2012 - Enes Midžić
 2012–2016 - Borna Baletić
 2016–2021 - Franka Perković-Gamulin
 2021–present – Davor Švaić

See also 
University of Zagreb
Zagreb Academy of Fine Arts
Zagreb Academy of Music
Sibila Petlevski

References

External links 

  

Educational institutions established in 1896
Faculties of the University of Zagreb
Art schools in Croatia
Donji grad, Zagreb
1896 establishments in Austria-Hungary